This article contains information about the literary events and publications of 1777.

Events
February 8 – Thomas Chatterton's volume Poems, Supposed to Have Been Written at Bristol, by Thomas Rowley, and Others, in the Fifteenth Century is published anonymously and posthumously in London, edited by Thomas Tyrwhitt, who still at this time believes them to be genuine work by a medieval monk transcribed by Chatterton.
March – Fanny Burney is introduced to Samuel Johnson by her father, Charles Burney.
April 1 – Friedrich Maximilian Klinger's play Sturm und Drang is premièred by the Seyler theatrical company in Leipzig. It gives its name to the Sturm und Drang movement in German literature.
April 12 – The poet and grammarian Robert Lowth is appointed Bishop of London.
May 8 – The first performance of Richard Brinsley Sheridan's comedy of manners The School for Scandal takes place at the Theatre Royal, Drury Lane in London.
October – James Boswell's essays first appear as a column called The Hypochondriak in The London Magazine.
unknown date – Det Dramatiske Selskab is founded in Copenhagen (Denmark) as an acting academy.

New books

Fiction
Frances Brooke – The Excursion
Henry Mackenzie – Julia de Roubigne
Samuel Jackson Pratt
Charles and Charlotte
(as Courtney Melmoth) Travels for the Heart
Clara Reeve (anonymously) – The Champion of Virtue
Lady Mary Walker
Letters from the Duchesse de Crui
Memoirs of the Marchioness de Louvoi

Drama
Charles Dibdin – The Quaker
Johann Wolfgang von Goethe – Iphigenie auf Tauris
John O'Keeffe – The Shamrock
Richard Brinsley Sheridan – The School for Scandal
Nicolás Fernández de Moratín – Guzman el Bueno
Hannah More – Percy (prologue and epilogue by David Garrick)
Friedrich Maximilian Klinger – Sturm und Drang

Poetry

Thomas Chatterton – Poems
William Combe 
The Diaboliad
The First of April
Thomas Day – The Desolation of America
William Dodd – Thoughts in Prison
William Roscoe – Mount Pleasant
Thomas Warton – Poems
Paul Whitehead – Poems
Nicolás Fernández de Moratín – Las naves de Cortés destruidas

Non-fiction
Hugh Blair – Sermons
Jacques-François Blondel – Cours d'architecture ou traité de la décoration, distribution et constructions des bâtiments contenant les leçons données en 1750, et les années suivantes, vol. 9
Edmund Burke – Letter to the Sheriffs of Bristol
James Cook – A Voyage Toward the South Pole
Georg Forster – A Voyage Round the World in His Britannic Majesty's Sloop Resolution, Commanded by Capt. James Cook, during the Years, 1772, 3, 4, and 5
Nicolás Fernández de Moratín – Carta histórica sobre el origen y progresos de las fiestas de toros en España
John Howard – The State of the Prisons in England and Wales
David Hume – The Life of David Hume
Hannah More – Essays
Maurice Morgann – An Essay on the Dramatic Character of Sir John Falstaff
Joseph Priestley
Disquisitions Relating to Matter and Spirit
The Doctrine of Philosophical Necessity Illustrated
Isaac Reed – The Repository
William Robertson – The History of America
Philip Dormer Stanhope, 4th Earl of Chesterfield – Characters
Johannes Nikolaus Tetens – Philosophische Versuche über die menschliche Natur und ihre Entwicklung (Philosophical Essays on Human Nature and Its Development)

Births
February – James Johnson, Irish surgeon and medical writer (died 1845)
February 12 – Friedrich de la Motte Fouqué, German Romantic novelist (died 1843)
February 16 – Maria Hack, English children's writer (died 1844)
June 3 – Antonio Gasparinetti, Italian poet, playwright and military officer (died 1824)
July 27 – Thomas Campbell, Scottish poet (died 1844)

Deaths
February 3 – Hugh Kelly, Irish poet and dramatist (born 1739)
September 24 (bur.) – James Fortescue, English poet (born 1716)
October 12 (October 1 O.S.) – Alexander Sumarokov, Russian poet and dramatist (born 1717)
October 21 – Samuel Foote, English dramatist (born 1720)

References

 
Years of the 18th century in literature